Local elections were held in the United Kingdom in 1974, during the life of the minority Labour government of Harold Wilson.  Elections were held in all the boroughs of London.

The number of councillors was increased, enabling all of the three largest parties to make net gains in council seats.  Labour gained 544 seats and had 10,325 councillors after the elections.
The Conservatives gained 393 seats, leaving them with 8,102 councillors.
The Liberals gained 47 seats, giving them a total of 1,474 councillors.

In terms of council control in London, Labour won 18 councils, the Conservatives 13.  One borough, Havering, was in no overall control, having been a Labour council after the 1971 local elections.  
The Conservatives gained Bexley and Merton from Labour and Harrow from no overall control.

In Scotland these were the first elections for the new Regional and District councils, with people voting twice.  The Scottish National Party did not do particularly well compared with their performance in the two general elections that year.  Labour won a majority in Strathclyde and Fife regions.

Summary of results

England

London boroughs

Scotland

District councils

†Four districts were renamed shortly after the elections. Argyll became Argyll and Bute, Bishopbriggs and Kirkintilloch became Strathkelvin, Cumbernauld became Cumbernauld and Kilsyth and Merrick became Wigtown.

Regional councils

References
Notes

Bibliography
Local elections 2006. House of Commons Library Research Paper 06/26.

 
Local elections